The department of Indigenous and Municipal Relations was created on May 3, 2016 by the newly-elected government led by Brian Pallister. It combined the responsibilities of the former departments Aboriginal and Northern Affairs and Municipal Government into a single unit.

Related Legislation

Indigenous Relations

Municipal Relations

See also
List of Manitoba government departments and agencies

References

External links
Government of Manitoba - Indigenous and Municipal Relations

Manitoba government departments and agencies